José José, el príncipe de la canción, or simply El príncipe de la canción is a Spanish-language American biographical telenovela that premiered on Telemundo on 15 January 2018 and concluded on 6 April 2018. The show is based on the life of the Mexican singer José José, and Alejandro de la Madrid stars as the titular character.

The first season is on Netflix since 1 June 2018 and has a total of 75 episodes.

Cast 
 Alejandro de la Madrid as José José
 María Fernanda Yepes/Alpha Acosta as Anel
 Itatí Cantoral as Natalia "Kiki" Herrera
 Rosa María Bianchi as Margarita Ortiz
 Damián Alcázar as José Sosa Esquivel
 Danna Paola as Lucero
 Ana Ofelia Murguía as Carmelita
 Juan Carlos Colombo as Carlos Herrera Calles
 Raquel Pankowsky
 Carlos Bonavides as Don Manuel Gómez
 Silvia Mariscal
 Jorge Jimenez as Abel Solares
 Carlos Athié as Pedro Salas
 Manuel Balbi as Nacho
 Gonzalo Vega Jr. as José José (young)
 Mauricio Isaac as Chumo
 Axel Arenas as Gonzalo Sosa
 Sylvia Sáenz as La Güera
 Yunuen Pardo as Mili Graf
 José Angel Bichir as Manuel Noreña Grass
 Pedro de Tavira as Alfonso Lira
 Ricardo Polanco as La Jorja
 Alejandro Calva as Toño Camacho
 Ariana Ron Pedrique as Laurita
 José María Galeano
 Gabriel Navarro as Jorge Landa
 Fernanda Echeverria
 Yolanda Abbud as La Negra
 Malillany Marín as Sara Salazar
 Ana Layevska as Christian Bach

Production

Background 
The pre-production of the series was confirmed in 2012 under the title of Nace un ídolo, but 5 years later it was confirmed through a Telemundo press conference for the 2017-2018 television season.

Promotion 
The first teaser of the series was shown for the first time in August 2017, while the complete advance of the series was launched on Telemundo on 19 December 2017, during the broadcast of the fourth season of Señora Acero, during that same time, it was also revealed that will air on Telemundo on 15 January 2018. The first three episodes were released online on 1 January 2018.

Ratings 
 
}}

Notes

Episodes

References

External links 
 

2018 telenovelas
2018 American television series debuts
2018 American television series endings
Telemundo telenovelas
Spanish-language American telenovelas
Spanish-language telenovelas